Grammitis stenophylla, commonly known as the narrow-leafed finger fern, is a fern in the family Polypodiaceae native to New South Wales and Queensland in eastern Australia.

References

stenophylla
Epiphytes
Flora of New South Wales
Ferns of Australia